Let's roll is a catchphrase for moving and starting an activity, attack, mission, or project.
Let's roll may also refer to:

Let's Roll (album), a 2003 blues album by Etta James
"Let's Roll", a song by Adina Howard from her album The Second Coming
"Let's Roll", a song by Montreal band The Stills from their album Logic Will Break Your Heart
"Let's Roll", a 2011 song by Yelawolf
"Let's Roll", a song by Neil Young from his album Are You Passionate?
 Let's Roll, a series by comedy gaming group Achievement Hunter, in which they play board games